Tired mountain syndrome is a condition in which underground nuclear testing fractures and weakens rock, increasing permeability and the risk of release of radionuclides and radioactive contamination of the environment. Locations said to have undergone the syndrome include the French Polynesian island of Moruroa, Rainier Mesa in the United States, the Dnepr 1 nuclear test site on the Kola Peninsula in Russia, possibly Mount Lazarev in the Novaya Zemlya Test Site in Russia, and Mount Mantap in North Korea.

See also
Subsidence crater

Footnotes

References

Underground nuclear weapons testing
Geological hazards